Czarnowąsy  is a village in the administrative district of Gmina Dobrzeń Wielki, within Opole County, Opole Voivodeship, in south-western Poland.

Geography

It is situated on the Mała Panew river near its confluence with the Oder.

History
The settlement of Charnovanz was first mentioned in a 1228 deed issued by the Piast duke Casimir I of Opole, when he relocated a Premonstratensian (Norbertine) nunnery from Rybnik to the site, centered on St Norbert Church. The monastery was vested with extended estates; it was devastated by Swedish troops during the Thirty Years' War in 1643 and the nuns fled to Boleslawiec in Greater Poland. After the war, the monastery was rebuilt in a Baroque style finished in 1682.

From 1684 to 1688, a Baroque wooden church was erected south of the village at the site of a medieval chapel dedicated to Saint Anne. On 19 August 2005 the building burnt down completely, presumably by an arson attack, but has since been restored in its original condition.

The monastery's estates were finally secularised by order of the Prussian government in 1810. The present-day convent was re-established in 1870 by the Breslau bishop Heinrich Förster with the consent of Pope Pius IX.

Part of the German Empire since 1871, the village remained with Germany upon the Upper Silesia plebiscite of 1921; it was renamed Klosterbrück by the Nazi authorities in 1936. After World War II, the area became part of the re-established Republic of Poland (see Territorial changes of Poland after World War II).

Notable people
Dietmar Wolter (born 1941), surgeon, inventor and entrepreneur.

References

Villages in Opole County